Kumasi Airport  is a national airport in Ghana serving Kumasi, the capital of the Ashanti Region. In 2022, the airport handled over 450,000 passengers making it the second busiest airport in Ghana after Kotoka International Airport in Accra.

Kumasi International Airport is located 6 kilometres (4 mi) from Kumasi. It was changed from a military base to an airport in 1999. The airport has undergone several renovation and expansion projects to help push its status as an international airport.

History 
Approval to start an airport in Kumasi by the then British government was obtained in 1940, even though the land acquisition documentation was completed and paid for in 1947. Prior to that, in 1943, the Kumasi Airport had been completed and was in use. The airport was started as a military air force base for the British Royal Air Force during World War II.

There were extensive developments on the runway, navigational facilities as well as human resource in 1958 and 1959 by the Government of Ghana to ensure the enhancement of internal airline operations.

In the late 1970s, there was a major uplift through installations of runway and Taxiway lights and an extension of the main runway to the southern part of the Airport.

On 1 December 1993 a new Terminal building and the installation of a VOR/DME were commissioned by President Jerry John Rawlings. The airport was changed from a fully military base into a domestic airport in 1999.

In 2008, renovation works were done by Bans Consult limited at the airport including the rehabilitation of the arrival and departure halls, the control room, rescue and fire station and the construction of a VIP Lounge ahead of the African Cup of Nations 2008 (CAN 2008) which Ghana was hosting.

Airlines and scheduled destinations

Statistics 
These data show number of passengers movements into the airport, according to the Ghana Civil Aviation Authority.

Upgrades into an international airport 
The Kumasi Airport attained its international status in 2014. However, the airport only operated on a regional level even though it had the full complement of security, customs, and immigration staff in place since 2003. Even though it had attained that status, work to upgrade the physical structures was yet to be put in place fully. The Kumasi Airport has undergone several rehabilitation and upgrades to become help ensure its status as international airport.

In 2012, initial renovation works were started on the existing facilities involved patching and filing of cracks on the main runway, construction of additional waiting room and building a car park to make way for future renovation and upgrades targeted for the following year.

Expansion projects

Phase 1 
In 2013, the Government of Ghana embarked upon a phased development of the Kumasi Airport to provide the requisite infrastructure for safe domestic and international operations to ensure safety and comfort for passengers whilst ensuring Ghana had a fully functioning international airport along with Kotoka International Airport.

Phase 1 works to upgrade the Kumasi Airport to international standard was scheduled to be completed by the end of 2014. The first phase consisted of the rehabilitation of the defective runway and installation of airfield lights and aeronautical ground lights on the runway to facilitate night operations at the airport. The commissioning of the Phase 1 which happened in December 2014, was earmarked with a historic first night landing by the then President John Dramani Mahama Prior to this upgrade an Instrument Landing System (ILS) was installed to aid pilots for take off and land.

Phase 2 

Plans to start working on the phase 2 which is to cost around €65 million had been decided by November 2016, the project covered mainly the construction of a new two-storey ultra-modern terminal of 7,000 square metres of space based on a 400-passenger per hour and an annual passenger traffic forecast of 1,500,000,parking areas and a ring road around the airport. The building is to also include spaces like VVIP and VIP lounges, restaurants, commercial areas, three boarding gates, a central screening system for passengers, an IATA standard baggage handling system and also offices for the airline companies.

In December 2016, President John Dramani Mahama along with a representative of the Asantehene, Otumfuo Osei Tutu II, Asafohene Acheamfuo Kwame Akowuah cut the sod for work to begin on the second phase of the Kumasi Airport project by Contracta Engenhiria Ltd

In June 2018, President Nana Addo Dankwa Akufo-Addo cut sod for the second phase of the expansion of Kumasi Airport, which is expected to be completed in 24 months. It will see the expansion of the runway from 1,981 meters to 2,300 meters, and the

construction of a new terminal building with a capacity of 1 million passengers per year.

Phase 3 
In April 2019, the Parliament of Ghana approved a budget of €58.9 million for Phase 3 of the development of the Kumasi Airport. Phase 3 includes an extension of the terminal building, a fire station, fire access routes and an air control tower. It also includes the extension of the car park and access roads, an apron extension, a runway strip, and an airside service road. The second and third phases are currently being done concurrently and are expected to be completed by October 2022.

See also 

 Accra (Kotoka International) Airport
 Tamale Airport

References

External links
 
 

Airports in Ghana
Buildings and structures in Kumasi